The National Assembly of State Arts Agencies (NASAA) is a non-profit membership organization for state and jurisdictional arts agencies in the United States.

Background
NASAA advocates for federal funding for the arts and aims to protect that portion of the National Endowment for the Arts (NEA) grant budget that is dedicated to state arts agencies. It provides national representation for state arts agencies

NASAA monitors state arts agency trends and documents the scope and impact of state arts agency activities. NASAA collects and curates and publishes data and information on a range of topics:

Funding
Current data on state arts agency revenues, including legislative appropriations levels, per capita funding and state rankings
Presentations and summaries that synthesize key trends in public funding for the arts
Information on dedicated revenue strategies that are used to supplement state arts agency budgets
Historical data on state arts agency appropriations from 1970 to the present day.

Grant Making
State agency grant making
Grants to individual artists
Support for local arts agencies
Funding for arts education
National Endowment for the Arts grant making.

State Arts Agencies
Terms, powers and duties of state arts agency councils
State arts agency staffing and compensation data
State arts agency structure and organizational charts
Placement of state arts agencies within state government.

Publications
NASAA publications provide information on strategic planning, needs assessment and program evaluation methods specifically adapted to public arts agencies.

References

External links
National Assembly of State Arts Agencies website

Non-profit organizations based in the United States